HD 103197 is a star with a planetary companion in the southern constellation of Centaurus. It has an apparent visual magnitude of 9.40, which is too faint to be viewed with the naked eye. Based on parallax measurements, HD 103197 is located at a distance of 187 light years from the Sun. It is drifting closer with a radial velocity of −4.6 km/s.

This is a K-type main-sequence star with a stellar classification of K1V(p). In 1978, N. Houk noted that the cores of the star's H and K lines are weakly in emission; hence the 'p' code indicating a spectral peculiarity. The star is an estimated five billion years old with a projected rotational velocity of approximately 0.6 km/s and it appears to be very inactive. It has 90% of the mass and 95% of the radius of the Sun. Its metal content is five-eighths greater than in the Sun. 

In 2009, a gas giant exoplanet companion was discovered using the radial velocity method.

See also 
 List of extrasolar planets

References 

K-type main-sequence stars
Planetary systems with one confirmed planet

Centaurus (constellation)
CD-49 06573
103197
057931